Lomonte is a surname. Notable people with the surname include:

Ciro Lomonte, Sicilian politician
Frank LoMonte, American lawyer and journalist
Mauricio Lomonte (born 1982), Cuban radio announcer and television host

See also
LaMonte
Lomont